The National Census of 2001 was the 2nd comprehensive national census of the Republic of South Africa, or Post-Apartheid South Africa.

It was organised and planned by Statistics South Africa in terms of the Statistics Act from the beginning of 1999, under the commission of the Statistician-General Pali Lehohla. The enumeration primarily took place from 10 to 31 October 2001 and the results were published in 2003.

Pre-enumeration

This was the first South African census to use a Geographic Information System to determine the Enumeration Areas. Traditionally, the areas were created using analogue and sketch maps. This geographic database was created out of several data sets acquired from government departments and private sector companies. It included topographic maps, cadastral data, administrative boundaries, aerial photography, satellite imagery and videography. Each area was classified according to its location as one of four types:

 Formal urban area
 Informal urban area
 Rural area (commercial farms)
 Tribal (traditional) area

The country was divided into approximately 80,000 manageable "pockets of land" with an average of 150 living spaces in each Enumeration Area. The intention was that each area could be handled by a single enumerator, to allow every household in the country to be visited within the timeframe provided.

The census questionnaire was developed and tested on a computer-based census administration system at the end of 2000. The main pilot for the census was conducted in February and March 2001, all aspects of enumeration were tested. It resulted in many revisions of both processes and management methods. The 1996 census questionnaire was used as a basis, with some key differences in labour related questions. Three questionnaires were printed:

 The household questionnaire (A) could collect information for ten people in workers' hostels, student hostels, residential hotels or private residencies.
 The individual in an institution questionnaire (B) was an individual form for a person in institutions or tourist hotels, additionally it was used for the homeless.
 The institution questionnaire (C) was for the institution as a whole to provide a list of all the residents on census night, against which completed B questionnaires could be checked.

Data Processing
As the 2001 Census was paper-based, an enormous amount of data needed to be converted to a digital format. The task of data processing consists of primarily four parts: data capture, post-data capture, coding and product generation.

Over 1000 temporary staff members were employed by Statistics South Africa to assist in the process. These employees worked in shifts, 7 days a week for almost 18 months. In total, 10 249 185 questionnaires were received which resulted in the generation of over 117 million images once scanned.

Post-enumeration Survey (PES)

Results

Demographics

See also

 Official 2001 Census Website
 Census in South Africa
 South African National Census of 1996
 South African National Census of 2011
 Demographics of South Africa

References

Censuses in South Africa
2001 in South Africa
2001 censuses
October 2001 events in South Africa